Hughes Range can refer to:

 Hughes Range (Antarctica) 
 Hughes Range (British Columbia) in Canada; see List of mountains of British Columbia